Charles Boateng may refer to:

 Charles Boateng (footballer, born 1989), Ghanaian footballer
 Charles Boateng (footballer, born 1997), Ghanaian footballer